Vladimir Beekman (23 August 1929 – 3 October 2009) was an Estonian writer, poet and translator.

Early life and education
After completing his primary education, he attended the Tallinn University of Technology and graduated in 1953 with a degree in chemistry. From 1953 to 1956, he was head of the fiction department at the Estonian State Publishing House, after which he decided to become a freelance writer.

Career
After 1968, he served on the board of the Estonian Writers' Union, rising from Secretary to Chairman, in 1983. In 1975, he was named an Honored Writer of the Estonian SSR.

Personal life

He was married to Aimée Beekman (née Malla), a graduate of the Gerasimov Institute of Cinematography, who was also a successful and widely translated author. They worked together on an important film, Fellow Villagers, that showed some freedom from Soviet control. The plot involved an unsuccessful espionage attempt from a Western country, but it did exhibit some Post-Stalinist freedoms. In particular, it explored the daily problems of fishermen who are portrayed as real people with alternative views which are not cast as either right or wrong.

References

External links
 Vladimir Beekman at Estonian Writers' Online Dictionary

1929 births
2009 deaths
Writers from Tallinn
Members of the Central Committee of the Communist Party of Estonia
Members of the Supreme Soviet of the Estonian Soviet Socialist Republic, 1975–1980
Members of the Supreme Soviet of the Estonian Soviet Socialist Republic, 1980–1985
Eighth convocation members of the Soviet of Nationalities
Eleventh convocation members of the Soviet of Nationalities
Estonian male poets
Estonian translators
20th-century Estonian poets
20th-century Estonian writers
20th-century male writers
20th-century translators
Gerasimov Institute of Cinematography alumni
Tallinn University of Technology alumni
Recipients of the Order of the Red Banner of Labour
Recipients of the Order of Friendship of Peoples
Recipients of the Order of the White Star, 4th Class
Burials at Rahumäe Cemetery